Emerson Panigutti (born February 13, 1976)  is a retired Argentine footballer.

Panigutti is a classic example of the international journeyman footballer. He has played for fifteen teams in eight countries.

Career
After 12 years playing abroad and in the lower leagues of Argentina, Panigutti returned to the Argentine first division for the 2010–11 season, signing with Olimpo.

References

External links
 Emerson Panigutti – Argentine Primera statistics at Fútbol XXI  
 Emerson Panigutti at BDFA.com.ar 

1976 births
Living people
People from San Cristóbal Department
Argentine footballers
Ferro Carril Oeste footballers
Alianza Atlético footballers
Olympiakos Nicosia players
S.D. Quito footballers
C.D. Universidad Católica del Ecuador footballers
Deportes Tolima footballers
Deportivo Italia players
Olimpo footballers
Argentine Primera División players
Cypriot First Division players
Categoría Primera A players
Ecuadorian Serie A players
Expatriate footballers in Cyprus
Expatriate footballers in Mexico
Expatriate footballers in Colombia
Expatriate footballers in Ecuador
Expatriate footballers in Peru
Expatriate footballers in Venezuela
Argentine expatriate footballers
Argentine expatriate sportspeople in Colombia
Argentine expatriate sportspeople in Ecuador
Argentine expatriate sportspeople in Cyprus
Argentine expatriate sportspeople in Mexico
Argentine expatriate sportspeople in Peru
Argentine expatriate sportspeople in Venezuela
Estudiantes de Mérida players
Association football forwards
Sportspeople from Santa Fe Province